X